Shaolin Plot is a 1977 Hong Kong film directed by Huang Feng with Sammo Hung in his first starring role and as action director. Huang had been Hung's mentor. Filming took place in South Korea.

Cast
 James Tien as Little Tiger
 Chan Sing as Prince Daglen
 Sammo Hung as Renegade Monk
 Casanova Wong as Warrior Monk
 Mang Hoi as Assassin Beggar
 Lam Ching Ying as Soldier
 Chung Fat as Monk
 Peter Chan as Traitor
 Fung Hak On as Enemy
 Mars as Monk (as Fo Sing)
 Billy Chan as Monk
 Austin Wai as Monk
 Yuen Wah as Soldier
 Yuen Biao as School Fighter
 Stephen Tung as Soldier
 Kam Kong
 Elton Chong

References

External links 
 

1977 films
1977 martial arts films
Hong Kong action films
1977 action films
1970s Cantonese-language films
Hong Kong martial arts films
Kung fu films
1970s Hong Kong films